Tripartite motif containing 38 is a protein that in humans is encoded by the TRIM38 gene.

Function

This gene encodes a member of the tripartite motif (TRIM) family. The encoded protein contains a RING-type zinc finger, B box-type zinc finger and SPRY domain. The function of this protein has not been identified. A pseudogene of this gene is located on the long arm of chromosome 4. [provided by RefSeq, Jul 2012].

References

Further reading